The 2000–01 season was the 86th season of the Isthmian League, which is an English football competition featuring semi-professional and amateur clubs from London, East and South East England. The league consisted of four divisions.

Premier Division

The Premier Division consisted of 22 clubs, including 18 clubs from the previous season and four new clubs:
 Croydon, promoted as champions of Division One
 Grays Athletic, promoted as runners-up in Division One
 Maidenhead United, promoted as third in Division One
 Sutton United, relegated from the Football Conference

Farnborough Town won the division and returned to the Football Conference after two seasons spent in Isthmian League. Slough Town, Carshalton Athletic and Dulwich Hamlet finished bottom of the table and relegated to Division One. Three fixtures left unfulfilled due to bad weather conditions.

League table

Division One

Division One consisted of 22 clubs, including 17 clubs from the previous season and five new clubs:
Three clubs relegated from the Premier Division:
 Aylesbury United
 Boreham Wood
 Walton & Hersham

Two clubs promoted from Division Two:
 Ford United
 Northwood

Initially, champions of Division Two Hemel Hempstead Town were to be promoted to Division One, but later they were refused due to ground grading. Leatherhead finished in the relegation zone were reprieved.

Boreham Wood won the division and returned to the Premier Division at the first attempt. Bedford Town and Braintree Town also get a promotion. Leatherhead finished in the relegation zone the second time in a row and were relegated along with Romford and Barton Rovers.

League table

Division Two

Division Two consisted of 22 clubs, including 17 clubs from the previous season and five new teams:

Two clubs relegated from Division One:
 Chertsey Town
 Leyton Pennant

Three clubs promoted from Division Three:
 East Thurrock United
 Great Wakering Rovers
 Tilbury

Initially, previous season champions of Division Two Hemel Hempstead Town were to be promoted to Division One, but later they were refused due to ground grading and stayed in the division.

Tooting & Mitcham United won the division and were promoted to Division One along with Windsor & Eton and Barking. Later, Barking ceased to exist when they merged with East Ham United (11° Essex Senior League) to form Barking & East Ham United, taken place of Barking in Division One.

League table

Division Three

Division Three consisted of 22 clubs, including 17 clubs from the previous season and five new teams:
 Arlesey Town, promoted as champions of the Spartan South Midlands League
 Ashford Town, promoted as champions of the Combined Counties League
 Chalfont St Peter, relegated from Division Two
 Wingate & Finchley, relegated from Division Two
 Witham Town, relegated from Division Two

Arlesey Town and Ashford Town both debuted in the league and achieved a promotion along with Lewes. Two fixtures left unfulfilled due to bad weather conditions.

League table

See also
Isthmian League
2000–01 Northern Premier League
2000–01 Southern Football League

References

Isthmian League seasons
6